Asian Securities and Investments Federation (ASIF) is an association of finance and investment professionals throughout Asia and Oceania with 7 member societies. The association seeks to serve the finance and investment community by fostering high professional standards, including examinations and accreditation, and facilitating communication among member societies. ASIF also promotes education through such activities as annual conferences, publications and educational programs.

History
Formed in 1979 under the name Asian Securities Analysts Council (ASAC), it was subsequently renamed to Asian Securities Analysts Federation (ASAF) in 1995 and to its present title in December 2008.

ASIF Member societies
  Financial Services Institute of Australasia (FINSIA)
 The Securities Analysts Association of China (SAAC)
 Securities Analysts Association, Chinese Taipei (SAA, CT)
 Hong Kong Securities and Investment Institute (HKSI)
 The Securities Analysts Association of Japan (SAAJ)
 The Korea Certified Investment Analysts Association (KCIAA)
 Securities Analysts Association, in Thailand (SAA, Thailand)

Executive committee
Chairman
 Yasuhiro Maehara, President & CEO, The Security Analysts Association of Japan (SAAJ), (Deputy Chairman of ACIIA)

Deputy Chairman
 Lin Yixiang, President, The Securities Analysts Association of China (SAAC) (Chairman of ACIIA)
Directors
 Craig Lindsay, President, Hong Kong Securities Institute (HKSI)
 Russell Thomas, CEO & MD, Financial Services Institute of Australasia (Finsia)

Standing Committees
 Education Committee, Chair, Naoko Mori (SAAJ)
 Advocacy Committee, Chair, Russell Thomas (Finsia)
 Communications Committee, Chair, Kazumichi Karita (SAAJ)

References
 Asian Securities and Investment Federation

External links
 Asian Securities and Investment Federation
 Financial Services Institute of Australasia
 The Securities Analysts Association of Chinese Taipei
 The Securities Association of China
 Hong Kong Securities Institute
 The Council for Portfolio Management and Research
 Iranian Institutional Investors Association
 The Securities Analysts Association of Japan
 The Korea Certified Investment Analysts Association
 Institute of Finance Professional New Zealand Inc
 The Association of Certified International Investment Analysts

Analyst societies
Business and finance professional associations